Plasmodium durae is a parasite of the genus Plasmodium subgenus Giovannolaia.

Like all Plasmodium species P. durae has both vertebrate and insect hosts. The vertebrate hosts for this parasite are birds.

Description 

The parasite was first described by Herman in 1941.

Mature gametocytes tend to lie obliquely within the host cell, displace the nucleus to one pole of the cell and possess one or more clumps of clear pigment granules.

Systematics

It is related to the following species:

Plasmodium asanum
Plasmodium circumflexum
Plasmodium fallax
Plasmodium formosanum
Plasmodium gabaldoni
Plasmodium hegneri
Plasmodium lophrae
Plasmodium lophrae
Plasmodium pediocetti
Plasmodium pinotti
Plasmodium polare

Geographical occurrence 

This species is found in the United States of America and South Africa.

Clinical features and host pathology 

Hosts of this species include domestic turkeys (Meleagris gallopavo) and Swainson's Francolin (Francolinus swainsoni).

References

Further reading 

durae
Bacteria described in 1941
Poultry diseases
Parasites of birds